The 1908–09 FA Cup was the 38th staging of the world's oldest association football competition, the Football Association Challenge Cup (more usually known as the FA Cup). Manchester United won the competition for the first time, beating Bristol City 1–0 in the final at Crystal Palace, through a goal from Sandy Turnbull.

Matches were scheduled to be played at the stadium of the team named first on the date specified for each round, which was always a Saturday. If scores were level after 90 minutes had been played, a replay would take place at the stadium of the second-named team later the same week. If the replayed match was drawn further replays would be held at neutral venues until a winner was determined. If scores were level after 90 minutes had been played in a replay, a 30-minute period of extra time would be played.

Calendar
The format of the FA Cup for the season had two preliminary rounds, five qualifying rounds, four proper rounds, and the semi finals and final.

First round proper
37 of the 40 clubs from the First and Second divisions joined the 12 clubs who came through the qualifying rounds. Of the League sides, Bradford Park Avenue were entered at the fourth qualifying round, while Gainsborough Trinity and Chesterfield were put into the fifth qualifying round. Bradford went out in that round, losing to Croydon Common. Ten non-league clubs joined the other two sides in winning through to the first round Proper.

Fifteen non-league sides were given byes to the first round to bring the total number of teams up to 64. These were:

32 matches were scheduled to be played on Saturday, 16 January 1909, except for one game which was played three days later. Ten matches were drawn and went to replays in the following midweek fixture, of which one went to a second replay.

Second round proper
The sixteen second round matches were played on Saturday, 6 February 1909. Six matches were drawn, with the replays taking place in the following midweek fixture.

Third round proper
The eight third-round matches were scheduled for Saturday, 20 February 1909. There were two replays, played in the following midweek fixture.

Fourth round proper
The four quarter final matches were scheduled for Saturday, 6 March 1909, although only two games were played on this date. The Burnley–Manchester United (the game was played 5 March and was abandoned for bad weather conditions after 72 minutes at 1-0 for Burnley) and Derby County–Nottingham Forest ties were played instead four and seven days later, respectively. The other two games were drawn, and replayed on 10 March.

Semifinals

The semi-final matches were played on Saturday, 27 March 1909. Bristol City and Derby County drew their match, and went on to replay it four days later. Bristol City won this tie, and so went on to meet the other semi-final winner, Manchester United, in the final.

Replay

Final

The final was played on 24 April 1909 at Crystal Palace, and was contested by Manchester United and Bristol City, both of the First Division. Manchester United won by a single goal, scored by Sandy Turnbull midway through the first half. This was the first of United's twelve FA Cup titles to date.

Match details

See also
FA Cup final results 1872-

References
General
Official site; fixtures and results service at TheFA.com
1908-09 FA Cup at rsssf.com
1908-09 FA Cup at soccerbase.com

Specific

1908-09
FA
Cup